Q: Soul Bossa Nostra is a 2010 studio album by Quincy Jones, recorded with various artists. The album was released on November 9, 2010. The title of the album refers to Jones' 1962 instrumental track "Soul Bossa Nova".

Background 
Recorded as a tribute to Jones, and featuring re-interpretations of songs associated with him, it was Jones' first original album since 1995's Q's Jook Joint. Jones served as executive producer.

In a press release announcing the album Jones stated, "Each artist picked a song that resonated with them for different reasons. I am honored that everyone wanted to be a part of this celebration of these songs. They all made them their own and knocked them out of the park."  Years later, he told an interviewer for New York "I was not in favor of doing it, but the rappers wanted to record something as a tribute to me, where they'd do versions of songs that I’d done over my career. I said to them, "Look, you got to make the music better than we did on the originals." That didn't happen. T-Pain, man, he didn't pay attention to the details."

Track listing 
Credits adapted from the album's liner notes.

References 

2010 albums
Quincy Jones albums
Albums produced by Quincy Jones
Collaborative albums
Qwest Records albums
Interscope Records albums
Albums produced by Jermaine Dupri
Albums produced by Q-Tip (musician)
Albums produced by Scott Storch
Albums produced by RedOne
Hip hop albums by American artists